John C. Barbour (April 18, 1895 – May 25, 1962) was an American politician who served in the New Jersey General Assembly from 1929 to 1932 and in the New Jersey Senate from 1933 to 1936.

References

1895 births
1962 deaths
Majority leaders of the New Jersey Senate
Republican Party members of the New Jersey General Assembly
Republican Party New Jersey state senators
Presidents of the New Jersey Senate
People from Haledon, New Jersey
20th-century American politicians